Maxime Beaumont (born 23 April 1982) is a French sprint canoeist. He competed in the individual 200 m event at the 2012 and 2016 Olympics and finished fourth and second, respectively. He won four medals in individual and two-man events at the world championships in 2013–2015.

Career
Beamont took up canoeing aged nine and was named Sportsperson of the Year in Boulogne sur Mer in 2014 and 2015. He studies at the National Institute of Sport, Expertise and Performance and plans to become a coach after the 2016 Olympics.

References

External links

 
 

French male canoeists
1982 births
Living people
Olympic canoeists of France
Canoeists at the 2012 Summer Olympics
Canoeists at the 2016 Summer Olympics
Canoeists at the 2015 European Games
Olympic silver medalists for France
Olympic medalists in canoeing
Medalists at the 2016 Summer Olympics
People from Boulogne-sur-Mer
Sportspeople from Pas-de-Calais
Mediterranean Games bronze medalists for France
Mediterranean Games medalists in canoeing
Competitors at the 2018 Mediterranean Games
Canoeists at the 2019 European Games
European Games gold medalists for France
European Games medalists in canoeing
Canoeists at the 2020 Summer Olympics